Dryope melanderi is a fly from the family Dryomyzidae. It has recently been placed in the genus Dryope, having been more widely known as Dryomyza melanderi. It is named after American entomologist Axel Melander.

Distribution
This is a western Nearctic fly, occurring in Canada (British Columbia, Quebec) and the United States (Alaska, Idaho).

References

Dryomyzidae
Diptera of North America
Insects described in 1957